Podlesí is a municipality and village in Příbram District in the Central Bohemian Region of the Czech Republic. It has about 1,100 inhabitants.

Notable people
Jaroslav Ježek (1923–2002), industrial designer

References

Villages in Příbram District